This is a list of primary urban areas in England ordered by population, based on data from the United Kingdom Census 2001: it has not been revised with data from the United Kingdom Census 2011 and does not appear to be any longer in use.

The concept of a primary urban area was introduced by HM Government for statistical and macro-planning purposes and given the shorthand title of 'city'. In reality, a PUA may contain multiple settlements, even multiple cities. It should not be confused with 'urban areas' or 'built-up areas' that are more rigorously defined by the Office for National Statisticsor even city status.

Historically, the boundaries of cities within England and the United Kingdom as a whole have remained largely undefined, leading to difficulties in comparisons between them. However, a definitive list of cities in the United Kingdom, which in itself would constitute a type of definition known as an Extensional definition (specifically, an enumerative definition) does exist, though it does not define the limits of these cities. To allow such comparisons to be made the Office of the Deputy Prime Minister, in conjunction with other Government departments, began compiling reports and a database to allow comparison of the English cities. This report is known as the State of the English Cities Report and was maintained by the Department for Communities and Local Government.

Using this definition the term "city" is used as a primary urban area, which is distinct from the Office for National Statistics urban area agglomerations, with a total population in excess of 125,000. The population figures are based on the cumulative total population of the constituent wards. This list is not the same as the list of local authorities which have been granted city status and is intended to define the physical extent of the largest urban centres. These are available from the State of the Cities Database.

However, some controversy arose when using these terms, for example the Manchester PUA contains the City of Manchester and also includes that of the City of Salford which is a metropolitan borough and has held city status since 1926. The inclusion of the City of Wolverhampton and the Black Country in the Birmingham PUA also led to a meeting of the West Midlands group of MPs where their displeasure was made clear to David Miliband, then the minister in charge.  This inclusion of Wolverhampton demonstrates differences between PUAs and the Eurostat equivalent, where Wolverhampton has its own larger urban zone.

In addition, some found controversial the use of the term 'city' to describe primary urban areas such as Aldershot, Blackburn, Burnley, Bolton, Chatham, Mansfield, Milton Keynes, Reading, Rochdale and Southend since these have not been granted letters patent and are therefore formally towns.

References

England